Sorin Drăghici is a Romanian-American computer scientist, and a Program Director in Division of Information and Intelligent Systems  (IIS) of the Directorate for Computer and Information Science and Engineering (CISE) at the National Science Foundation (NSF). Previous positions include: Associate Dean  for Entrepreneurship and Innovation of Wayne State University's College of Engineering, the Director of the Bioinformatics and Biostatistics Core at Karmanos Cancer Institute, and the Director of the James and Patricia Anderson Engineering Ventures Institute. Draghici was elected a Fellow of the  Institute of Electrical and Electronics Engineers (IEEE) in 2022, for contributions to the analysis of high-throughput genomics and proteomics data

Biography 

Draghici was born and raised in Bucharest, Romania. He studied computer engineering at the Politehnica University of Bucharest  from where he obtained an M.Sc. He completed a Ph.D. in Computer Science at the University of St Andrews, UK in the area of deep learning/neural networks. He joined  the Computer Science Department at  Wayne State University in 1996.

Current position 
Draghici is a Program Director in the Directorate for Computer and Information Science and Engineering (CISE) at the National Science Foundation (NSF).  He is also a Professor in the Department of Computer Science College of Engineering and Obstetrics and Gynecology in the School of Medicine.  Draghici is also the founder and CEO of AdvaitaBio and main contributor to iPathwayGuide and iVariantGuide.

Research
His research area is computational biology and bioinformatics, in particular GO analysis, pathway analysis, meta-analysis, and drug repurposing. His research has been supported by the National Science Foundation, National Health Institutes and others. He has published over 190 scholarly papers  and two technical books: Statistics and Data Analysis for Microarrays Using R and Bioconductor and Data Analysis Tools for DNA Microarrays.

He is an editor for IEEE/ACM Transactions on Computational Biology and Bioinformatics, Current Protocols in  Bioinformatics, Journal of Biomedicine and Biotechnology, and a senior editor of the Discoveries Journal.

References

External links
Home page at Wayne State University
Citations at Google Scholar

Wayne State University faculty
21st-century American engineers
Year of birth missing (living people)
Living people
Romanian computer scientists